The Edmonton Rugby Union is the administrative body for rugby union in Edmonton and Northern Alberta.

External links
 Official site

Rugby union in Alberta
Sport in Edmonton
Rugby union governing bodies in Canada